Chance is a 2020 American drama film directed by John B. Crye and starring Matthew Modine.  It is based on the true story of Chance Smith, a teenager from Ohio who killed himself.  It is also Crye's feature directorial debut.

Cast
Matthew Modine as Mike Daly
Blake Cooper as Chance Smith
Jake Hertzman as Young Chance
Tanner Buchanan
Amanda Leighton
Pamela Daly
Michelle Gardner

Production
The film was shot in Brown County, Ohio.

Release
The film was originally scheduled to be released in limited theaters in Ohio and Kentucky on April 9, 2020.  However, due to the COVID-19 pandemic, the film was officially released on May 22, 2020 at the Starlite Drive In in Amelia, Ohio.

References

External links
 
 
 

American drama films
2020 drama films
American films based on actual events
Films shot in Ohio
2020 films
2020s English-language films
2020s American films